Jiggs is an unincorporated community in Elko County, Nevada, United States, in the Mound Valley at the south end of State Route 228. It contains a very small school.

The community is part of the Elko Micropolitan Statistical Area.

History
The site was formerly a year-round camp for Native Americans gathering pine nuts.

Prior names for the settlement had been Mound Valley, Skelton, and Hylton—unfortunately, all at the same time. Since no one could seem to agree on a name, postal authorities chose a new name from a list submitted by local ranchers for the new post office to be established December 18, 1918. One of the names was Jiggs, a character in the Bringing Up Father comic strip, who was always bickering with his wife Maggie.

The town was the headquarters for "King Fisher", a fictional character created by author Zane Grey.

The town was featured in a 1965 Volkswagen advertising campaign in which the entire population (5 adults, 4 children and a dog) was shown comfortably seated inside a VW Bus.

Notable residents
 Lewis R. Bradley, 2nd Governor of Nevada
 Edward P. Carville, 18th Governor of Nevada
 Waddie Mitchell, Cowboy poet

References

External links

Ruby Mountains
Unincorporated communities in Elko County, Nevada
Elko, Nevada micropolitan area
Unincorporated communities in Nevada